Montague Francis Ashley-Montagu (June 28, 1905November 26, 1999) — born Israel Ehrenberg — was a British-American anthropologist who popularized the study of topics such as race and gender and their relation to politics and development. He was the rapporteur, in 1950, for the UNESCO statement "The Race Question".

As a young man he changed his name from Ehrenberg to "Montague Francis Ashley-Montagu".  After relocating to the United States he used the name "Ashley Montagu".

Montagu, who became a naturalized American citizen in 1940, taught and lectured at Harvard, Princeton, Rutgers, the University of California, Santa Barbara, and New York University. Forced out of his Rutgers position after the McCarthy hearings, he repositioned himself as a public intellectual in the 1950s and 1960s, appearing regularly on television shows and writing for magazines and newspapers. He authored over 60 books throughout this lifetime. In 1995, the American Humanist Association named him the Humanist of the Year.

Early life and education
Montagu was born Israel Ehrenberg on June 28, 1905, in London, England. He grew up in London's East End. He remembered often being subjected to antisemitic abuse when he ventured out of his own Jewish neighborhood. Montagu attended the Central Foundation Boys' School. He developed an interest in anatomy very early and as a boy was befriended by Scottish anatomist and anthropologist Arthur Keith under whom he studied informally.

In 1922, at the age of 17, he entered University College London, where he received a diploma in psychology after studying with Karl Pearson and Charles Spearman and taking anthropology courses with Grafton Elliot Smith and Charles Gabriel Seligman. He also studied at the London School of Economics, where he became one of the first students of Bronisław Malinowski. In 1931, he emigrated to the United States. At this time, he wrote a letter introducing himself to Harvard anthropologist Earnest Hooton, claiming to having been "educated at Cambridge, Oxford, London, Florence, and Columbia" and having earned M.A. and PhD degrees. In reality, Montagu had not graduated from Cambridge or Oxford and did not yet have a PhD. He taught anatomy to dental students in the United States, and received his doctorate in 1936, when he produced a dissertation at Columbia University, Coming into being among the Australian Aborigines: A study of the procreative beliefs of the native tribes of Australia which was supervised by cultural anthropologist Ruth Benedict. He became a professor of anthropology at Rutgers University, working there from 1949 until 1955.

Career
During the 1940s, Montagu published a series of works questioning the validity of race as a biological concept, including the UNESCO "Statement on Race", and his very well known Man's Most Dangerous Myth: the Fallacy of Race. He was particularly opposed to the work of Carleton S. Coon, and the term "race". In 1952, together with William Vogt, he gave the first Alfred Korzybski Memorial Lecture, inaugurating the series.

Montagu wrote the Foreword and Bibliography of the 1955 edition of Mutual Aid: A Factor of Evolution by Petr Kropotkin, which was reprinted in 2005.

Due to disputes concerning his involvement with the UNESCO "Statement on Race", Montagu became a target for anti-communists, and, lacking tenure, was dismissed from Rutgers University and "found all other academic avenues blocked." He retired from his academic career in 1955 and moved to Princeton, New Jersey to continue his popular writing and public appearances. He became a well-known guest of Johnny Carson's The Tonight Show. He addressed his numerous published studies of the significant relationship of mother and infant to the general public. The humanizing effects of touch informed the studies of isolation-reared monkeys and adult pathological violence that is the subject of his Time-Life documentary Rock A Bye Baby (1970).  Also in 1970, Montagu resided at the North Shore Inn, which was the last year of the inn’s operation before it was razed that fall. The North Shore Inn was located on the grounds of the world famous Chautauqua Institution, in Chautauqua County, NY. The institute is renowned as a gathering place for philosophy, anthropology, opera, and the arts. Thomas Edison had a summer home there as well.

Later in life, Montagu actively opposed genital modification and mutilation of children. In 1994, James Prescott wrote the Ashley Montagu Resolution to End the Genital Mutilation of Children Worldwide: a Petition to the World Court, The Hague, named in honor of Montagu, who was one of its original signers.

Montagu was a noted critic of creationism. He edited Science and Creationism, a volume which refuted creationist arguments.

A posthumous biography of Montagu, Love Forms the Bones, was written by anthropologist Susan Sperling and published in 2005.

Work

Statement on Race 
Montagu was one of the ten scientists invited to serve on a UNESCO committee addressing race, later known as the Committee of Experts on Race Problems. The main purpose of the organization was to contribute to world peace and security through science and culture. The group wrote a series of Statements on Race to spread awareness that humans are all one species and that "race" is not a valid biological concept. Montagu co-authored these Statements and later published a book, Statement on Race, presenting his own views on the theme in much more detail.

The first UNESCO Statement says, "Scientists have reached general agreement in recognizing that mankind is one: that all men belong to the same species, Homo sapiens." The first statement was put in such a way that laymen would be able to understand a scientist's point of view. They worded it so that people who were not knowledgeable about the subject would understand. "Homo sapiens is made up of a number of populations, each one of which differs from the others." That states that even though there is variability in the individual's genetic heritage, all belong to a discrete species and should be treated equally.

The second Statement says that since human history is widely diverse and complex, there are many human populations that cannot be easily classified “racially”. However, some anthropologists believe that mankind is classified into at least three major human races. Even though it is believed that there are many human races, it gives no support that there is one race that is superior or inferior to any of the other races.

The third Statement gives views on the biological aspect of the race question. It explains that different human groups diverged from a common stock and that is the reason for their biological differences. The third statement also goes into detail about human evolution and how important it is for H. sapiens to survive and grow.

The fourth Statement says, "All men are born free and equal both in dignity and in rights." The fourth statement says that racism stultifies development and threatens world peace. "The division of human species into 'races' is partly conventional and partly arbitrary and does not imply any hierarchy whatsoever."

Man's Most Dangerous Myth: The Fallacy of Race 
One of his works, Man's Most Dangerous Myth, was written in 1942, when race was considered the determinant of people's character and intelligence. Montagu presented a unique theory for his time: "in biology race is defined as a subdivision of species which inherits physical characteristics distinguishing it from other populations of the species. In this sense there are many human 'races.' But this is not the sense in which many anthropologists, race-classifiers, and racists have used the term." He admits that in a biological sense, there is the existence of races within mankind. However, he also believes that not all of mankind can be classified.  Part of his reasoning has to do with mixed origin, which has resulted in “overlapping” of physicalities. Instead of races and subspecies, he prefers the notion of mixed ethnic groups. His writing further emphasizes the complexity of our descent and rejects claims that support one race being superior when compared to others.

He says this idea or concept of race originated around the 18th century. The concept developing as a direct result of slavery and the slave trade. As a side effect of slavery, naturally, humanity has divided racially; this has carried and proceeded to dominate culture. The physical difference furthered the establishment of races and evident differences between individuals. He mentions Darwin and other forefathers who touched on this topic when they attempted to explain race to all. He touches on society, genetics, psychological, culture, war, democracy, eugenics, and social factors as contributors that enhance this idea of race.

Man's Most Dangerous Myth was revised into new editions six times by Montagu, the last in 1997 when he was 92 years old, and is still in print over 75 years after its initial publication.

The Natural Superiority of Women 
Originally produced as a magazine article, The Natural Superiority of Women, published in 1952, was one of the major documents of second-wave feminism and the only one written by a man. Using his background as a physical anthropologist, Montagu points to the biological advantages that the women of the human species have for long-term survival. The book was revised five times, the last edition published shortly before his death in 1999 and still in print.

The Elephant Man 
Possibly one of Montagu's least significant works was the most famous one. His biography of a deformed 19th century British man, Joseph Merrick, dubbed The Elephant Man, was published in 1971 and formed the basis of the 1980 movie directed by David Lynch.

Legacy
An Ashley Montagu Fellowship for the Public Understanding of Human Sciences has been established at the University of Sydney, in Australia, and is currently held by anthropologist Dr Stephen Juan. Survived by his wife and by three children, Audrey Murphy of Sutton, Mass.; Barbara Johnstone of Princeton; and Geoffrey Montagu of Los Angeles, at the time he also had four grandchildren and two great-grandchildren.

In popular culture
 Montagu is the writer and director of the film One World or None. Produced in 1946 by The National Committee on Atomic Information, this short documentary exposes the dangers of nuclear weapons and argues that only international cooperation and proper control of atomic energy can avoid war and guarantee the use of this force for the benefit of mankind.
 Footage of Ashley Montagu talking with Charlton Heston about his character in the movie appears as a bonus in the special DVD edition of The Omega Man.
Archive footage of him, among others (including Carl Sagan), is featured in The X-Files episode "Gethsemane."
The saying "International law exists only in textbooks on international law," which is often attributed to Albert Einstein, was in fact said to Einstein by Montagu.

Selected bibliography
Coming Into Being Among the Australian Aborigines, New York: E. P. Dutton & Company, 1938.
Man's Most Dangerous Myth: The Fallacy of Race, New York: Harper, 1942.
Adolescent Sterility, Springfield: Charles C Thomas, 1946.
On Being Human, New York: H. Schuman, 1950.

The Direction of Human Development: Biological and Social Bases, New York: Harper, 1955.
. A critique of Arnold J. Toynbee's seminal A Study of History.
Anthropology and Human Nature, Boston: P. Sargent, 1957.
Man: His First Million Years, Cleveland: World Pub. Co., 1957.
The Cultured Man, Cleveland: World Pub. Co., 1958.
Human Heredity, Cleveland: World Pub. Co, 1959.
Life Before Birth, New York: New American Library, 1964.
The Concept of Race (editor), New York: Free Press of Glencoe, 1964.
Up the Ivy, New York: Hawthorn Books, 1966. (published under the pseudonym Academicus Mentor)
Man's Evolution: An Introduction to Physical Anthropology, (co-authored with C. Loring Brace), New York: Macmillan, 1965.  Second edition published as Human Evolution: An Introduction to Biological Anthropology, New York: Macmillan, 1977, . 
The Anatomy of Swearing, New York: Macmillan, 1967.
Man and Aggression, New York: Oxford University Press, 1968.

The Elephant Man: A Study in Human Dignity, New York: Outerbridge and Dienstfrey, 1971.
Culture and Human Development, Englewood Cliffs, N.J.: Prentice-Hall, 1974, .
Race and IQ (editor), New York: Oxford University Press, 1975.
The Nature of Human Aggression, New York: Oxford University Press, 1976.
Learning Non-Aggression: The Experience of Non-Literate Societies (editor), New York: Oxford University Press, 1978, 
The Human Connection (co-authored with Floyd W. Matson), New York: McGraw-Hill,  1979, .
. 
Science and Creationism, Oxford; New York: Oxford University Press, 1984, .  Features the writing of Roger Lewin, Kenneth R. Miller, Robert Root-Bernstein, George M. Marsden, Stephen Jay Gould, Gunther S. Stent, Kenneth E. Boulding, Garrett Hardin, Laurie R. Godfrey, Isaac Asimov, Sidney W. Fox, L. Beverly Halstead, Roger J. Cuffey, Roy A. Gallant, Robert M. May, Michael Ruse, William R. Overton, and Sidney Ratner. 
Living and Loving (edited with notes by Tsuyoshi Amemiya and Kazuo Takeno), Tokyo: Kinseido, 1986, .
The Peace of The World, Tokyo: Kenkyusha, 1987, .
The Dehumanization of Man (co-author with Floyd Matson), New York: McGraw-Hill, 1983.

Man's Most Dangerous Myth: The Fallacy of Race, 6th edition. Walnut Creek CA: AltaMira Press, 1997
The Natural Superiority of Women, 5th edition. Walnut Creek CA: AltaMira Press. 1999.

References

Further reading

External links

Biographical sketch and publications
Ashley Montagu Institute: Bio of Ashley Montagu
Ashley Montagu Resolution
Mutilated Humanity
Territorialism and War from The Nature of Human Aggression (1976)

1905 births
1999 deaths
Critics of creationism
People educated at Central Foundation Boys' School
English anthropologists
British emigrants to the United States
Writers from London
English Jews
Jewish American writers
Jewish American social scientists
Genital integrity activists
Columbia University alumni
Alumni of the London School of Economics
Alumni of University College London
Harvard University faculty
New York University faculty
Princeton University faculty
International House of New York alumni
Rutgers University faculty
University of California, Santa Barbara faculty
Politics and race
Jewish anthropologists
20th-century American anthropologists
20th-century American Jews